Mahratta War may refer to:

First Anglo-Maratha War (1775–1802)
Second Anglo-Maratha War (1803–1805)
Third Anglo-Maratha War (1817–1818)

See also
Mahratta (disambiguation)

ru:Англо-маратхские войны